James J. Bradley (born February 19, 1945) is a politician in Ontario, Canada. He was a long-serving Liberal member of the Legislative Assembly of Ontario, sitting as an MPP from 1977 until 2018. He represented the riding of St. Catharines and served in the provincial cabinets of David Peterson, Dalton McGuinty and Kathleen Wynne. He was elected as a regional councillor in the St. Catharines municipal election of 2018. He is currently the Chair of the Regional Municipality of Niagara.

His 41 year term as an MPP is the second longest tenure in Ontario history, behind only Harry Nixon.

Background
Before entering politics, Bradley was a teacher with the Lincoln County Board of Education. He was elected as a city councillor to the St. Catharines City Council in 1970, but also remained in the classroom until 1977.

Politics
After failed bids in the elections of 1967 and 1971, Bradley was elected to the Ontario legislature in the 1977 election in the riding of St. Catharines, and served as MPP for that riding until the 2018 election. He fended off strong challenges from the New Democratic Party in the 1990 election and the Progressive Conservative Party in 1995 election. On all other occasions until 2018, he was re-elected.

Peterson government
When the Liberals came to power under David Peterson following the 1985 election, Bradley became Minister of the Environment and held that position until the Liberals were defeated in the 1990 election.  He is generally regarded as Ontario's most effective Environment Minister, although some believe that his ambitions for the portfolio were undermined by Peterson and Finance Minister Robert Nixon. As Environment Minister, Bradley expanded Blue Box Recycling, making it a province-wide initiative, as well as instituting tough new penalties for polluters, enforced by a strengthened investigation and enforcement branch.

In opposition
Bradley was a vocal opponent of Peterson's plans to call an election in 1990, preferring that the party wait until 1992 before going to the polls. While the Liberals were defeated, Bradley was personally re-elected and had a prominent position in the Opposition benches.

When Nixon, the interim leader of the Liberals, left Queen's Park to accept an appointment, he was replaced by Murray Elston. Elston resigned as interim leader to run in the 1992 leadership convention, and Bradley became interim leader of the party and interim Leader of the Opposition from November 1991 until the election of Lyn McLeod in February 1992. He remained an opposition stalwart until the Liberals won the 2003 election under Dalton McGuinty.

|-

McGuinty government
There was some speculation that Bradley would be re-appointed Minister of the Environment in McGuinty's government, but this did not occur. Instead, he was named Minister of Tourism and Recreation on October 23, 2003. He was also given ministerial responsibility for Seniors on June 29, 2005. On October 11, 2005, Bradley was also appointed to replace Dwight Duncan as Government House Leader, following Duncan's appointment as Minister of Finance. Bradley is also the province's wine secretary, as well as the minister responsible for the Greenbelt.

On October 30, 2007, Bradley was sworn in as Minister of Transportation in McGuinty's new cabinet. As Transportation Minister, Bradley supervised the introduction of an Ontario Enhanced driver's licenses to be used at Canada/US border crossings. He introduced legislation to merge GO Transit and Metrolinx. Enacted tougher penalties for drivers who have a BAC of .05 or higher. Mandated that all commercial trucks that operate in Ontario be equipped with speed limiters to ensure heavy trucks don't exceed 105 km/h. And in April 2009, it was announced that GO Transit would be expanded to the Niagara region, with bus service to Burlington in September and with weekend rail service to Toronto starting at the end of June.

On January 18, 2010, Bradley moved to the position of Minister of Municipal Affairs and Housing. In August he was moved to the Ministry of Community Safety and Correctional Services.

On October 20, 2011, Bradley moved to become Minister of Environment once again in the wake of the 2011 election that saw the previous Minister of Environment, John Wilkinson, defeated.

Wynne government
Bradley continued as Environment Minister in Kathleen Wynne's first cabinet after she won the leadership of the Liberal Party. Following the 2014 provincial election, the 69-year-old Bradley became a minister without portfolio with the title of Chair of Cabinet and was also appointed Deputy Government House Leader. He left cabinet in June 2016 as part of a cabinet shuffle, and later served as Chief Government Whip and Deputy Government House Leader.

In the 2018 election, Bradley lost his seat as the Liberal Party was defeated, losing official party status and suffering the greatest loss for any governing party in provincial history. He had served as St. Catharines MPP for 41 years.

Municipal politics
On July 27, 2018, the last day registration was open, Bradley registered to run for Niagara Regional Council.

Bradley was elected on October 22, 2018, finishing first out of 23 candidates with 18,954 votes.

On December 6, 2018, Bradley was selected as the Niagara Regional Chair, being elected on the first ballot receiving 19 out of 31 votes against two other candidates.

Electoral record

Source:

The 1999, 2003 and 2007 expenditure entries are taken from official candidate reports as listed by Elections Ontario. The figures cited are the Total Candidate's Campaign Expenses Subject to Limitation, and include transfers from constituency associations. The 1995 expenditures are taken from an official listing of election expenses published by Elections Ontario.

References

External links

1945 births
21st-century Canadian politicians
Leaders of the Ontario Liberal Party
Living people
Members of the Executive Council of Ontario
Ontario Liberal Party MPPs
Politicians from Greater Sudbury
St. Catharines city councillors